Richard Chappel Parsons (October 10, 1826 – January 9, 1899) was an American lawyer and politician who served as a U.S. Representative from Ohio for one term from 1873 to 1875.

Early life and career 
Born in New London, Connecticut, Parsons pursued classical studies, and moved to Norwalk, Ohio, in 1845. He studied law, and was admitted to the bar in 1851 and commenced practice at Cleveland, Ohio. He was the law partner of Rufus P. Spalding, a prominent Ohio politician and jurist who would himself serve three terms in the U.S. House of Representatives.

Parsons was the son-in-law of Samuel Starkweather, who served non-consecutive terms as mayor of Cleveland, Ohio in the mid-1800s.

Early political career 
He served as member of the city council in 1852 and 1853 and served as president in 1853.
He served as member of the State house of representatives 1858-1861 and served one term as speaker.
He was appointed consul to Rio de Janeiro, Brazil, on March 27, 1862, but resigned, effective October 1, 1862.

He served as collector of internal revenue at Cleveland 1862–1866.
President Andrew Johnson offered Parsons the offices of Governor of Montana Territory and Assistant Secretary of the Treasury. He declined both, instead serving as the first Marshal of the Supreme Court of the United States from 1867 to 1872.

Congress 
Parsons was elected as a Republican to the Forty-third Congress (March 4, 1873 – March 3, 1875).
He was an unsuccessful Republican candidate for reelection to the Forty-fourth Congress.

Later career 
He resumed the practice of law in Cleveland, Ohio. He was editor and part owner with William Perry Fogg of the Cleveland Daily Herald in 1877.

Death
He died in Cleveland, Ohio, January 9, 1899. He was interred in Lake View Cemetery.

References

Sources

1826 births
1899 deaths
Politicians from New London, Connecticut
People from New London, Ohio
Lawyers from Cleveland
Ohio lawyers
Burials at Lake View Cemetery, Cleveland
Speakers of the Ohio House of Representatives
19th-century American newspaper publishers (people)
Cleveland City Council members
19th-century American diplomats
19th-century American journalists
American male journalists
19th-century American politicians
19th-century American male writers
Journalists from Ohio
Republican Party members of the Ohio House of Representatives
Marshals of the United States Supreme Court
19th-century American lawyers
Republican Party members of the United States House of Representatives from Ohio